Delhi: A Novel (published 1990) is a historical novel by Indian writer Khushwant Singh.

Text
The book moves backwards and forwards in time through the history of Delhi. It has as its backdrop the story of a journalist fallen on bad times (possibly an autobiographical figure) and his relationship with a hijra (eunuch) named Bhagmati.

This vast, erotic, irreverent magnum opus on the city of Delhi starts with the narrator, suggestively Khushwant Singh himself, just returning from England after ‘having his fill of whoring in foreign lands’, a bawdy, aging reprobate who loves the city of Delhi, as much as he loves the ugly but energetic hermaphrodite whore Bhagmati, whom he literally picks up from a deserted road on a hot Delhi summer noon. Having no place to go after completing her jail sentence in the dreaded Tihar Jail (probably for selling sex), she begs to be taken under his wing. The kind sardar obliges, and thus begins a wonderful relationship of ups and downs in the narrator’s life. Bhagmati, neither male nor female but possessive of great exotic sex appeal, vitalizes his life amidst the majestic remains of Delhi in its heyday, and even saves the narrator's life from the mad mobs of the 1984 anti-Sikh riots.

Displaying his trademark gift of literal humour and a professional historian’s control over narration, the writer takes turn, chapter by chapter, on the history of the great city and his own sexual exploits and misadventures with  vilaity mems and lonely army wives whom he is supposed to ‘show Delhi’, other eccentric journalists, editors and bureaucrats, a half-mad Sikh ex-army driver, a fanatic gurudwara , among many other colourful characters. All the while the narrator travels through times Delhi has seen, telling us in a most interesting manner, as the first person, all that Delhi has been to Nadir Shah, Taimur and Aurangzeb etc. who plundered and destroyed her, and to Meer Taqi Meer and Bahadur Shah Zafar whom Delhi destroyed; he looks through the eyes of semi-historical characters like Musaddi Lal Kayasth, a Hindu convert working under the hostile Ghiyas ud din Balban in the fourteenth century—the dawn of the Mughal Empire, right up to  Nihal Singh, a Sikh mercenary who settles his historical score with the Mughals by helping the British in crushing the Sepoy Mutiny of 1857 – the sunset of the Mughal empire, Mrs. Alice Aldwell, the wife to an English civil servant who converts to Islam to escape persecution (but is still raped), the dynamic, inventive and shrewd Punjabi entrepreneurs  who won the British contracts to build Lutyens's Delhi (Sir Sobha Singh, the writer's father, was one such person), to an angry young Hindu youth whose sister was abducted and raped in Pakistan, and has been disposed-of from Western Punjab during the Partition of India, looking for some work ends up signing up with Rashtriya Swayamsevak Sangh and takes revenge by inflicting violence upon Delhi Muslims, and accidentally becoming witness to perhaps the most important and decisive event in the country’s history—the assassination of Mahatma Gandhi.

The novel ends with the terrorized narrator watching his Sikh neighbours mercilessly burnt alive by people angered due to the killing of Indira Gandhi by her Sikh guards.

Writing 

Singh claims it took him almost twenty-five years to complete this novel.  He dedicates it to his son Rahul Singh and Niloufer Billimoria. 'History provided me a skeleton', he jokes, 'I covered it with flesh and injected blood and a lot of seminal fluid into it'.

Some parts of the novel were also published in the Evergreen Review and The Illustrated Weekly of India.

Urdu translation 
This novel was Urdu translated by Irfan Ahmad Khan, Lahore, Pakistan. Singh himself allowed Khan to recover royalty of his unauthorised publications from the publishers of Pakistan. The Urdu translation publications were in October 1998, April 1999, January 2000, May 2000, February 2005.

References 

1990 novels
Indian historical novels in English
1990 Indian novels
Novels set in Delhi
Novels by Khushwant Singh
Sikhism in fiction
1984 anti-Sikh riots
Cultural depictions of Indira Gandhi
LGBT literature in India